Dorothy Crater is an impact crater on Venus.

The names for small craters on Venus (with a diameter less than ) are chosen from common female names.  is a Greek first name, and the crater was officially designated by the IAU in 1997. The crater is east of Tamfana Corona, and south of Seoritsu Farra.

Like many impact craters on Venus, Dorothy has been flooded and buried by lava flows.

See also
 List of craters on Venus

References

Impact craters on Venus